Le Noyer is a commune in the Hautes-Alpes department in southeastern France. With its neighbouring hamlets of Le Serre, Le Martouret and Le Villard, it lies on the banks of the river Drac, close to the Écrins National Park.

Administration

List of mayors 
 GAUTHIER Dominique Laurent (1798-1800) 
 GAUTHIER Jacques (1800-1815) 
 JOUBERT Jean Jacques (1815-1831) 
 BERNARD Dominique (1831-1834) 
 JOUBERT Jean Jacques (1834-1842) 
 BEAUME Philippe (1842-1846) 
 GAUTHIER Balthazard (1846-1848) 
 DASTREVIGNE Jean Jacques (1848-1865) 
 DISDIER Hyppolite (1865-1873) 
 BEAUME Philippe (1873-1876) 
 FAUQUE Edouard (1876-1886) 
 VILLAR Jean Antoine (1886-1891) 
 BEAUME Alphonse (1891-1894) 
 VILLAR Jean Alexandre (1894-1907) 
 DISDIER Hyppolite (1907-1908) 
 ROUX Constantin (1908-1912) 
 FABRE Joseph (1912-1913) 
 ENCOYAND Joseph (1913-1921) 
 BEAUME Alphonse (1921-1944) 
 BLANC Jean (1944-1945) 
 GUILLAUMIER Emile (1945-1947) 
 VILLAR Louis (1947-1959) 
 FAUQUE Edouard (1959-1989)   
 FOUGAIROLLE Jacques (1989-2001) 
 LEDUC Jean (2001-2008) 
 FOUGAIROLLE Jacques (2008-2014) 
 NOUGUIER Renée (2014-2020) 
 PY Martine (2014-2020)

Population

See also
Communes of the Hautes-Alpes department

References

Communes of Hautes-Alpes